Alban Dorrinton (24 December 1800 – 28 November 1872) was an English cricketer. Dorrinton batted right-handed.

Born at West Malling, Kent, he was the son of Thomas Dorrinton. Dorrington made a single appearance in first-class cricket for Kent against Sussex in 1836 at the Royal New Ground, Brighton. In a match which Sussex won by seven wickets, he was last man out when he was dismissed for a duck in Kent's first-innings, while in their second-innings he was again the last man out when he was dismissed for 4 runs when he was run out.

He died in the town of his birth on 28 November 1872. His brother William Dorrinton also played first-class cricket.

References

External links

1800 births
1872 deaths
People from West Malling
English cricketers
Kent cricketers